BS BolticGöta, or for short "BG", is a bandy club in Karlstad, Sweden.

The two major bandy clubs in Karlstad, IF Boltic and IF Göta, was merged in the year 2000 and founded Föreningen Bandysällskapet BolticGöta Karlstad, in a shorter form called BS BolticGöta. Since 2008, the club uses the name IF Boltic again, even if the formal name stays the same.

The club was relegated from the Swedish top division during the 2006–2007 season.

References

External links
Official website

BolticGota BS
BolticGota
2000 establishments in Sweden
Sport in Karlstad